Aurélia Beigneux (born 2 June 1980), is a French politician.

Biography 
Born on 2 June 1980, she is a director of Epinorpa, a company founded in 2002.

Assistant for Social Affairs at the Town Hall of Hénin-Beaumont, she was in fourteenth position on the list of the National Rally for the 2019 European elections and elected.

Beigneux has been targeted in a litigation case by the RSA CAF, after a distortion between her income and declaration of resources has been discovered.

References 

1980 births
Living people
MEPs for France 2019–2024
21st-century French women politicians